Burlington is a borough in Bradford County, Pennsylvania, United States. It is part of Northeastern Pennsylvania. The population was 145 at the 2020 census. Children residing in the township are assigned to attend the Troy Area School District.

Geography
Burlington is located in central Bradford County at  (41.782906, -76.608549), on the north bank of Sugar Creek, a tributary of the Susquehanna River. It is bordered on the north, east, and south by Burlington Township and on the west by West Burlington Township.

U.S. Route 6 passes through the center of the borough, leading east  to Towanda, the county seat, and west  to Troy.

Demographics

As of the census of 2000, there were 182 people, 62 households, and 43 families residing in the borough. The population density was 302.8 people per square mile (117.1/km2). There were 64 housing units at an average density of 106.5 per square mile (41.2/km2). The racial makeup of the borough was 98.35% White, 0.55% Asian, and 1.10% from two or more races.

There were 62 households, out of which 35.5% had children under the age of 18 living with them, 54.8% were married couples living together, 11.3% had a female householder with no husband present, and 30.6% were non-families. 25.8% of all households were made up of individuals, and 9.7% had someone living alone who was 65 years of age or older. The average household size was 2.94 and the average family size was 3.44.

In the borough the population was spread out, with 27.5% under the age of 18, 7.1% from 18 to 24, 27.5% from 25 to 44, 22.0% from 45 to 64, and 15.9% who were 65 years of age or older. The median age was 34 years. For every 100 females there were 114.1 males. For every 100 females age 18 and over, there were 112.9 males.

The median income for a household in the borough was $36,250, and the median income for a family was $33,750. Males had a median income of $28,542 versus $17,500 for females. The per capita income for the borough was $15,951. About 10.9% of families and 14.8% of the population were below the poverty line, including 20.0% of those under the age of eighteen and none of those sixty five or over.

Notable people
Samuel McKean (1787-1841) - U.S. Senator for Pennsylvania, U.S. Congressman for Pennsylvania's 9th congressional district, served in both houses of the Pennsylvania legislature
Frederick B. Shaw (1869-1957) - U.S. Army brigadier general

References

Populated places established in 1790
Boroughs in Bradford County, Pennsylvania
1854 establishments in Pennsylvania